Niclas Tüchsen (born July 28, 1989) is a Danish football midfielder, who plays for the Rishøj BK. He played two games for Viborg FF in the Danish Superliga 2007-08 season.

External links
Danish national team profile
Danish Superliga statistics

Living people
1989 births
Danish men's footballers
Danish Superliga players
Association football midfielders
Køge Boldklub players
Hvidovre IF players
Viborg FF players
Hobro IK players
People from Solrød Municipality
Sportspeople from Region Zealand